Qualification for the boxing events at the 2016 Summer Olympics is based on the APB and WSB World Rankings, APB and WSB World and Olympic Qualifier, the 2015 World Championships, and the 2016 World Olympic Qualifying Tournament. For the women's events, qualification is based only on the 2016 Women's World Championships. For  both men and women, each boxer is selected to compete for the Games through the four Continental Olympic Qualifying Tournaments to be held in 2016.

Summary

Timeline

Men's events
Olympic qualification system per continent and by weight category.

* The number of quotas for America includes the five host country places subtracted.

Light flyweight (49 kg)

Flyweight (52 kg)

Bantamweight (56 kg)

Lightweight (60 kg)

Light welterweight (64 kg)

Welterweight (69 kg)

Middleweight (75 kg)

Light heavyweight (81 kg)

Heavyweight (91 kg)

Super heavyweight (+91 kg)

Women's events
Olympic qualification system per continent and by weight category.

* The number of quotas for America includes the host country place subtracted.

Flyweight (51 kg)

Lightweight (60 kg)

Middleweight (75 kg)

Notes
  Cuba's Andy Cruz Goméz originally secured a quota place in the men's bantamweight division through the World Series of Boxing (WSB), but later declined. As a result, Cuba's Olympic license was redistributed to Morocco's Mohamed Hamout.
  Morocco's Mohamed Hamout originally won a box-off victory over Ghana's Abdul Omar in the men's bantamweight division at the African Olympic Qualification Tournament. Following the adjustment of Olympic qualifying boxers as a result of Cuba's quota decline in the World Series of Boxing (WSB) rankings, Hamout's unused Olympic license was awarded to his opponent Omar in the same tournament.
  Tunisia's Aymen Trabelsi originally won a box-off victory over Cape Verde's Davilson Morais in the men's super heavyweight division at the African Olympic Qualification Tournament, but later declined, giving his nation's Olympic license to Morais.
  South Africa's Sibusiso Bandla (light flyweight) and Sikho Nqothole (flyweight) secured quota places for the Games through the continental qualifier, but later declined, as SASCOC made an agreement on the Rio 2016 Olympics qualification criteria that the continental qualifying route would not be considered. Hence, the unused places were awarded to Kenya's Peter Mungai Warui in men's light flyweight, and Lesotho's Moroke Mokhotho in men's flyweight, respectively.
  Turkey's Adem Kılıççı, who secured a quota place in the men's middleweight division with a top two finish in the AIBA Pro Boxing Rankings (APB), was suspended after his doping samples from London 2012 came back positive in retesting for steroids. As a result, Turkey's Olympic license was redistributed to Ukraine's Dmytro Mytrofanov.

References

 
Qualification